Amzya (Ämzä; , Emśe) is a rural locality (a village) in Balyklykulsky Selsoviet, Aurgazinsky District, Bashkortostan, Russia. The population was 78 as of 2010. There are 5 streets.

Geography 
Amzya is located 21 km southwest of Tolbazy (the district's administrative centre) by road. Naumkino is the nearest rural locality.

References 

Rural localities in Aurgazinsky District